Jhansi (Hindi: झांसी,) is a  historic city in the Indian state of Uttar Pradesh. Balwant Nagar was the old name of Jhansi. It lies in the region of Bundelkhand on the banks of the Pahuj River, in the extreme south of Uttar Pradesh. Jhansi is the administrative headquarters of Jhansi district and Jhansi division.

Jhansi is well connected to all other major towns in Uttar Pradesh by road and railway networks. The National Highways Development Project has supported development of the city. Jhansi is also being developed as the defense corridor by the NDA government which will boost the economy of the city and the region at the same time. Srinagar to Kanyakumari north–south corridor passes closely to Jhansi, as does the east–west corridor; consequently there has been a sudden rush of infrastructure and real estate development in the city. Jhansi was adjudged the third cleanest city of Uttar Pradesh and the fastest moving city in the North Zone in Swachh Survekshan 2018 rankings. The development of a greenfield airport has been planned in the city. On 28 August 2011 Jhansi was selected among 98 cities for smart city initiative by Government of India.

History

During ancient times, Jhansi was a stronghold of the Chandela Rajput kings and was known as Balwant Nagar. However, it lost importance in the 11th century after the decline of the Chandela dynasty. It rose in prominence in the 17th century when a Rajput Raja Bir Singh Deo of Orchha State constructed the Jhansi Fort in 1613.

Jhansi came under the Maratha Empire in 1729 when Maharaja Chattrasal offered Jhansi and some other parts of his state to the Maratha Peshwa Baji Rao I as a mark of gratitude for having helped him in defeating the Nawaf of Farrukhabad Muhammad Khan Bangash who had attacked Maharaja Chattrasal's kingdom.

In the 18th century, the town of Jhansi served as the capital of a Maratha province and later the Princely State of Jhansi from 1804 till 1858, when the territory became a part of British India.

After the independence of India, Jhansi was included in the state of Uttar Pradesh

Geography and climate
Jhansi is located at 25.4333 N 78.5833 E. It has an average elevation of 284 metres (935 feet). Jhansi lies on the plateau of central India, an area dominated by rocky relief and minerals underneath the soil. The city has a natural slope in the north as it is on the south western border of the vast Tarai plains of Uttar Pradesh and the elevation rises on the south. The land is suitable for species of citrus fruit and crops include wheat, pulses, peas, and oilseeds. The region relies heavily on Monsoon the rains for irrigation purposes. Under an ambitious canal project (the Rajghat canal), the government is constructing a network of canals for irrigation in Jhansi and Lalitpur and some part of Madhya Pradesh. The trade in agricultural products (including grain and oilseeds) is of great economic importance. The city is also a centre of brassware manufacture.

Climate

Being on a rocky plateau, Jhansi experiences extreme temperatures. Winter begins in October with the retreat of the southwest monsoon (Jhansi does not experience any rainfall from the Northeast Monsoon) and peaks in mid-December. Temperatures are about  minimum and  maximum. Spring arrives by the end of February and is a short-lived phase of transition. The rainy season starts by the third week of June (although this is variable year to year), while the monsoon rains gradually weaken in September and end before the last week of September.

Demographics

As of 2011 Indian Census, Jhansi city had a total population of 505,693, of which 265,449 were males and 240,244 were females. Population within the age group of 0 to 6 years was 55,824. The total number of literates in Jhansi city was 373,500, which constituted 73.9% of the population with male literacy of 78.9% and female literacy of 68.3%. The effective literacy rate of 7+ population of Jhansi city was 83.0%, of which male literacy rate was 88.9% and female literacy rate was 76.6%. The Scheduled Castes and Scheduled Tribes population was 110,318 and 1,681 respectively. Jhansi city had 91150 households in 2011.

The Jhansi urban agglomeration had a population of 547,638 which also included Jhansi Cantonment and Jhansi Railway Settlement.

Jhansi Cantonment
Jhansi Cantonment had a total population of 28,343 in 2011, of which 17,023 were males and 11,320 were females. Population within the age group of 0 to 6 years was 3,404. The total number of literates in Jhansi Cantonment was 23,354, which constituted 82.4% of the population. The effective literacy rate of 7+ population of Jhansi Cantonment was 93.6%. The Scheduled Castes and Scheduled Tribes population was 4,735 and 28 respectively. It had 30460 households in 2011.

Jhansi Railway Settlement
Jhansi Railway Settlement had a total population of 13,602 as of 2011, of which 7,226 were males and 6,376 were females. Population within the age group of 0 to 6 years was 1,168. The total number of literates in Jhansi Railway Settlement was 10,754, which constituted 79.1%. The effective literacy rate of 7+ population of Jhansi Railway Settlement was 86.5%, of which male literacy rate was 92.1% and female literacy rate was 80.2%. The Scheduled Castes and Scheduled Tribes population was 3,373 and 38 respectively. It had 30460 households in 2011.

Songs and Poems
A number of patriotic songs have been written about the Rani. The most famous composition about Rani Lakshmi Bai is the Hindi poem Jhansi ki Rani written by Subhadra Kumari Chauhan. An emotionally charged description of the life of Rani Lakshmibai, it is often taught in schools in India. A popular stanza from it reads: 

Translation: "From the bards of Bundela we have heard this story / She fought valiantly like a warrior woman, she was the queen of Jhansi."

For Marathi people there is an equally well-known ballad about the brave queen penned at the spot near Gwalior where she died in battle, by B. R. Tambe, who was a poet laureate of Maharashtra and of her clan. A couple of stanzas run like this:

Translation: "You, denizen of this land, pause here and shed a tear or two / For this is where the flame of the valorous lady of Jhansi was extinguished / … / Astride a stalwart stallion / With a naked sword in hand / She burst open the British siege / And came to rest here, the brave lady of Jhansi!"

Education

Higher education
 Rani Lakshmi Bai Central Agricultural University
 Bundelkhand University
 Central Ayurveda Research Institute, formerly National Vrkshayurveda Research Institute, Jhansi

Medical and technical colleges

In October 2009, the Union health ministry gave approvals for setting up an institute equivalent to AIIMS, the first in Bundelkhand region and developing central agriculture university.
 Bundelkhand Institute of Engineering & Technology
 Government Polytechnic Jhansi
 Maharani Laxmi Bai Medical College, established 1968
 SR Group of Institutions, Jhansi

Maharani Laxmi Bai Para medical Training College, Jhansi

Schools
 Army Public School, Jhansi
 Bhani Devi Goyal Saraswati Vidhya Mandir Inter College
 Cathedral College Jhansi
 Christ the King College, Jhansi
 Delhi Public School, Jhansi
 The Aryans, Jhansi
 Blue Bells Public School, Jhansi
 The Gramodaya International College, Mauranipur, Jhansi 
 Hafiz Siddiqui National Inter College
 Jai Academy
Kendriya Vidyalaya, Jhansi
Mahatma Hansraj Modern School
Margret Leask Memorial College
Modern Public School, Jhansi
Rani Laxmibai Public School, Jhansi
RNS World School, Jhansi 
Sainik School, Jhansi
Saraswati Vidya Mandir, Jhansi
Sheerwood College, Jhansi

St. Francis Convent School, Jhansi
St. Marks Public School
St. Columbus International Public School, Jhansi
Sun International School, Jhansi
Government Inter College, Jhansi
Saraswati Pathshala industrial Inter College, Jhansi

Transport
The city is connected to other parts of India by railways and major highways.

Railways

Jhansi has its own division in the North Central Railway zone of Indian Railways. It lies on the main Delhi-Chennai and Delhi-Mumbai lines. The station code is VGLB. Trains for every part of the country are available 24*7, The first ever Shatabdi Express commenced it's journey from New Delhi to Jhansi Jn. Each and Every trains stops at Jhansi Jn.

Road transport
Jhansi is located at the junction of these National Highways: National Highway 27 (India) from Gujarat to Assam; National Highway 75 (India) from Gwalior to Rewa via Chhatarpur; National Highway 44 (India) from Jammu to Kanyakumari; and National Highway 39 (India). Thus, Jhansi commands a strategic position in the roadways network as highways in five different directions diverge from it.

The towns and major cities connected to it are Datia, Gwalior, Lalitpur, Agra, New Delhi, Bhopal, Allahabad, Kanpur, Lucknow, Babina, Orchha, Banda, Shivpuri, Chhatarpur, Unnao Balaji, and Sagar.

Air transport

Jhansi Airport is a military aviation base built in the British era used by the Indian army and political visitors. Though there are provisions for private aircraft to land, there are no civil aviation operations. There had been a demand to make it operational for commercial purposes in the 1990s and again in the 2000s. The Uttar Pradesh government announced the construction of an all new civil aviation base to support tourism in Bundelkhand in April 2011.

Armed forces
The Jhansi Cantonment was the site of the accommodation for British civil and military personnel in the period of British rule in India. Jhansi district is the headquarters of the 31st Indian Armoured Division, stationed at Jhansi-Babina. There has been a joint exercise from 1 to 30 March 2012 with the Singaporean Army at Jhansi witnessed by the President of India, Pratibha Patil.

Media
Amar Ujala, Dainik Jagran, Patrika, and Dainik Bhaskar are some of the newspapers with online news services.

Newspapers
Many national and local newspapers are published in Jhansi in Hindi, Urdu and English:

Radio
Jhansi has five radio station :-Radio Mirchi 98.3 FM, 92.7 BIG FM, 103.0 AIR FM and 91.1 Red FM and 93.5 Fm.

Sport
Sports stadiums in Jhansi are Dhyanchand Stadium, Railway Stadium, and LVM Sports Place.
Dhyanchand Stadium is the best place in jhansi to learn sports skills . Many Sports played in Dhyanchand Stadium like Hockey , cricket , football , chess and many more .

Notable people

 Rani Lakshmibai, queen of Jhansi (1853–58), consort of Maharaja Gangadhar Rao Newalkar of Jhansi
 Major Dhyan Chand, known as the  "Magician of Hockey"
 Ramesh Chandra Agarwal, media proprietor and founder-chairman of the Dainik Bhaskar group of newspapers
 Braj Basi Lal, Indian archaeologist former Director General of the Archaeological Survey of India (ASI), known for his contribution on Indus Valley Civilization sites, Mahabharat sites, Ramayana sites including discoveries in Ayodhya.
 Edward Angelo (born 1870), Australian politician
 Alexander Archdale, English actor in theatre and film
 Chandra Shekhar Azad, Indian freedom fighter
 Jhalkari Bai, freedom fighter and advisor to Rani Lakshmi Bai
 Vinod Kumar Bansal, Bansal classes, Kota
 Michael Bates, English actor; Last of the Summer Wine and It Ain't Half Hot Mum
 Raja Bundela, Indian actor, producer, politician and civil activist
 Bharat Ratna Major Dhyan Chand (Padma Bhushan), former Indian Army officer and Indian field hockey player
 Raghunath Vinayak Dhulekar MCA & Member of Parliament 1952, MLC &  Speaker Vidhan Parishad 1958, notable pleader, Social leader 
 Maithili Sharan Gupt, modern Hindi poet
 Hesketh Hesketh-Prichard, explorer, adventurer, big-game hunter and marksman who made a significant contribution to sniping practice within the British Army in the First World War
 Indeevar, Hindi films lyricist 
 Piyush Jha, film director and screenwriter and novelist of Indian origin
 Abdul Karim, an Indian attendant of Queen Victoria who served her during the final 15 years of her reign, gaining her maternal affection over that time.
 Subodh Khandekar, Olympian hockey player
 Pankaj Mishra, Indian essayist and novelist
 Joy Mukherjee, Indian actor and director
 Ram Mukherjee, Indian director
 Sashadhar Mukherjee, producer of Hindi films
 Subodh Mukherjee, director, producer, writer of Hindi cinema; hits include Paying Guest, Munimji, Love Marriage (parts were shot at Jhansi), and Junglee
 Randeep Rai, Indian television and film actor
 Gangadhar Rao, Raja of Jhansi State, 1838–53
 Saumitra Rawat, surgeon, chairman and Head, Surgical Gastroenterology and Liver Transplant, Sir Ganga Ram Hospital, New Delhi; 2015 Padma Shri
 Raaj Shaandilyaa, Bollywood writer and director
 Vishwanath Sharma, owner of Baidyanath Group, parliamentarian
 Amit Singhal, senior vice-president at Google
 Surendra Verma, Hindi author and playwright

Jhansi in popular culture

Jhansi in literature

Two novels by John Masters are set in the fictional town of Bhowani. According to the author, writing in the glossary to the earlier novel, Nightrunners of Bengal, Bhowani is an "imaginary town. To get a geographical bearing on the story it should be imagined to be about where Jhansi really is - 25.27 N., 78.33 E." Nightrunners of Bengal is set during the Indian Rebellion of 1857 at "Bhowani" (the title alludes to the mysterious distribution of "chapatis" to village headmen which preceded the revolt). Bhowani Junction is set in 1946/47 the eve of independence. In each novel the main character is a British army officer named Colonel Rodney Savage, one of a succession of such men from the same family.

Christina Rossetti wrote a short poem about the fate of the Skene family at Jhansi during the Indian Mutiny. It is entitled "In the Round Tower at Jhansi - 8 June 1857". It was published in 1862 in the same volume as her more celebrated poem "Goblin Market". Some time afterward, Rossetti discovered that she had been misinformed about the husband and wife's suicide pact in the face of a murderous and implacable enemy ('The swarming howling wretches below' the tower walls) which is the poem's subject, but did not delete it from later editions.
Jhansi is the centre of story in Vrindavan Lal Verma's Hindi novel 'Jhansi Ki Rani'.  This novel tells the story of Jhansi ki Rani Lakshmibai, who fought bravely in 1858-59 to save Jhansi from the Britishers's attack.

See also
 Barua Sagar
 List of educational institutions in Jhansi
 Matatila Dam
 Parichha
 Jhansi Ki Rani
 Jhansi Cantonment Cemetery

Gallery

References

External links

 
 

 
Cities in Bundelkhand
Bundelkhand
Cities in Uttar Pradesh